Malaysia (abbreviated MAS) has competed in all the Commonwealth Games held from 1966.

In 1950, 1958, and 1962 the country competed as Malaya (MAL),
see Malaya at the Commonwealth Games. 

In 1958 and 1962 North Borneo (BNB) (now Sabah) and Sarawak (SAR) competed separately at the Commonwealth Games (but not winning any medals). They both became states in the new country of Malaysia in 1963.

Host nation 
Malaysia has hosted the Games once, in 1998, at Kuala Lumpur.

Commonwealth Games

Medals by Games
At the 2022 Commonwealth Games, Malaysia was tenth in the medal tally, and was eleventh in the All-time tally of medals, with an overall total of 228 medals (66 Gold, 73 Silver and 89 bronze).
*Red border color indicates tournament was held on home soil. 

 During the 1950 games, Malaysia was represented by Malaya as well during the 1958 and 1962 games but joined together with British North Borneo (now Sabah) and Sawarak before competing as part of Malaysia from 1966.

Medals by sport
Updated after the 2022 Commonwealth Games

Medals by individual

Records

Commonwealth Youth Games

Medals by Games

See also
 Malaysia at the Olympics
 Malaysia at the Asian Games

References

 
Nations at the Commonwealth Games